The Metropolitan City of Catania is a metropolitan city in Sicily, southern Italy. Its capital is the city of Catania. It replaced the Province of Catania and comprises the city of Catania and other 57 municipalities (comuni).

History
It was first created by the reform of local authorities (Law 142/1990) and then established by the regional law 15 August 2015.

Geography

Territory
The metropolitan city borders with the Metropolitan City of Messina (the former Province of Messina), the Province of Enna, the Province of Syracuse, the Province of Ragusa and the Province of Caltanissetta. Part of its territory includes the Metropolitan area of Catania.
 
The Metropolitan City faces the Ionian Sea to the east, the Metropolitan City of Messina to the north, the Province of Enna and the Province of Caltanissetta to the west, the Province of Siracusa and the Province of Ragusa to the south. Mount Etna, Europe's largest active volcano, is located in the province.

Municipalities

 Aci Bonaccorsi
 Aci Castello
 Aci Catena
 Aci Sant'Antonio
 Acireale
 Adrano
 Belpasso
 Biancavilla
 Bronte
 Calatabiano
 Caltagirone
 Camporotondo Etneo
 Castel di Iudica
 Castiglione di Sicilia
 Catania
 Fiumefreddo di Sicilia
 Giarre
 Grammichele
 Gravina di Catania
 Licodia Eubea
 Linguaglossa
 Maletto
 Maniace
 Mascali
 Mascalucia
 Mazzarrone
 Militello in Val di Catania
 Milo
 Mineo
 Mirabella Imbaccari
 Misterbianco
 Motta Sant'Anastasia
 Nicolosi
 Palagonia
 Paternò
 Pedara
 Piedimonte Etneo
 Raddusa
 Ragalna
 Ramacca
 Randazzo
 Riposto
 San Cono
 San Giovanni la Punta
 San Gregorio di Catania
 San Michele di Ganzaria
 San Pietro Clarenza
 Sant'Agata li Battiati
 Sant'Alfio
 Santa Maria di Licodia
 Santa Venerina
 Scordia
 Trecastagni
 Tremestieri Etneo
 Valverde
 Viagrande
 Vizzini
 Zafferana Etnea

Government

List of Metropolitan Mayors of Catania

Transportation
There are many major roads that cross the territory of the province. The S.S 114 (Messina-Catania-Siracusa) links many of the coastal towns from Messina to Siracusa, the S.S 121 (Catania-Caltanissetta-Palermo), which links the east coast to Palermo through the major towns of Misterbianco, Paternò and Adrano. The S.S 417 (Catania-Gela) links Catania to the towns of Gela and Caltagirone. There are also the A18 Messina-Catania and A19 Catania-Palermo motorways that pass through the province.

The S.S 114 and S.S 192 (Catania-Enna) start from the Catania by pass whilst the SS.514 runs through the southern part of the province and connects to Ragusa. 

The main railroad is that connecting Messina to Syracuse.

Ferries are active from the port of Catania to Livorno, Malta and Naples.

See also
Province of Catania

References

External links
Official website 

Catania